Tarn Weir (born April 10, 1999) is an American soccer player who plays as a left back for FC Tucson of USL League One.

Career

Youth
Weir spent time with various youth sides in California, including four years with the academy of MLS side San Jose Earthquakes between 2013 and 2016. In 2017, he played with Marbella United in Spain, securing trials with Anderlecht and Troyes during his spell there. Following a spell in England with Chorley in 2018, Weir moved to Greek side Panthiraikos in February 2019.

Professional
Weir started his career with Oakland Roots in the NISA during their 2020 season, making 5 regular season appearances for the club.

On December 10, 2020, Weir re-signed with Oakland Roots ahead of their inaugural USL Championship season in 2021. He made his debut in the USL Championship on May 8, 2021, appearing as a 78th-minute substitute during a 3–0 defeat to Phoenix Rising.

Weir signed with FC Tucson on February 23, 2022.

Career statistics

References

External links
NISA profile

Living people
1999 births
American soccer players
Soccer players from California
Association football defenders
Oakland Roots SC players
FC Tucson players
National Independent Soccer Association players
USL Championship players
USL League One players